General Godfrey Nhlanhla Ngwenya,  (born 1950) was a South African military commander and diplomat. He served as Chief of Joint Operations from 2001 to 2005, and Chief of the South African National Defence Force from 2005 until 2011.

Early life
Godfrey Ngwenya was born in Johannesburg, South Africa, on 28 April 1950. He attended Orlando High School, where he matriculated in 1970. He joined the ANC and the ANC's Military Wing, Umkhonto we Sizwe (MK), at the height of the student uprisings in South Africa in 1976. While in exile he underwent military training in Angola and passed his further commanders' courses in the then German Democratic Republic and the Soviet Union. He has been married to his spouse Busi since 1984 and has 3 children, one of which is cult figure Duma Ngwenya.

Military career
Ngwenya joined Umkhonto weSizwe (MK), the military wing of the African National Congress, in 1976, and commanded MK forces in Angola from 1983 to 1989.  He transferred to the South African National Defence Force when MK was incorporated into it in 1994 and he was appointed as major general and served as Deputy General Officer Commanding of Witwatersrand Command in Johannesburg from 1994 to 1996.

From 1996 to 1998, Ngwenya was General Officer Commanding of the North West Command in Potchefstroom and from 1998 to the end of September 1999 Chief Director Force Preparation in the Army Office. He served as Deputy Chief of Joint Operations from 1 October 1999 to 31 December 2000. He was promoted to the rank of lieutenant general on 1 January 2001 and appointed as Chief of Joint Operations to 2005, when he was promoted to Chief of the South African National Defence Force.

Ambassador to Angola
After retirement from the army, Ngwenya was appointed Ambassador to Angola.

Awards and decorations

In May 2010, Ngwenya was awarded the United States Legion of Merit by then Chairman of the Joint Chiefs of Staff, Admiral Mike Mullen. The award recognised Ngwenya's leadership during a time of transition in the South African military and his country's support of vital United Nations peacekeeping operations in Sudan, Burundi and Congo.

In addition, Ngwenya has been awarded the following medals and decorations:

References

1950 births
Living people
South African Army generals
UMkhonto we Sizwe personnel
Ambassadors of South Africa to Angola
Commanders of the Legion of Merit
People from Johannesburg